The men's long jump at the 2016 European Athletics Championships took place at the Olympic Stadium on 6 and 7 July.

Records

Schedule

Results

Qualification

Qualification: 8.00 m (Q) or best 12 performers (q)

Final

References

Long jump
Long jump at the European Athletics Championships